Monika Babok (born November 30, 1991) is a Croatian swimmer, who specialized in freestyle and butterfly events. She represented her nation Croatia at the 2008 Summer Olympics, and has won a silver medal in the 50 m butterfly (27.48) at the 2007 European Junior Swimming Championships in Antwerp, Belgium. Babok was a member of the SMU Mustangs swimming and diving team, and a graduate of sports management at the Southern Methodist University in Dallas, Texas.

Babok competed for the Croatian swimming team in the women's 50 m freestyle, as Croatia's youngest swimmer (aged 16), at the 2008 Summer Olympics in Beijing. She qualified for the Games with a 26.25 to eclipse the insurmountable FINA B-cut (26.32) by 0.07 of a second at the European Championships in Eindhoven, Netherlands. Swimming as the fastest entrant in heat seven, Babok could not produce her pre-Olympic effort with 26.84 to accept the seventh spot in a splash-and-dash finish. Babok failed to advance into the semifinals, as she placed forty-ninth overall out of 92 swimmers in the prelims.

References

External links
Player Bio – SMU Mustangs
NBC Olympics Profile

1991 births
Living people
Croatian female swimmers
Olympic swimmers of Croatia
Swimmers at the 2008 Summer Olympics
Croatian female freestyle swimmers
Croatian female butterfly swimmers
People from Sisak
SMU Mustangs women's swimmers
21st-century Croatian women